Joaquín Blanco may refer to:
Joaquín Blanco Albalat (born 1989), Spanish Olympic sailor
Joaquín Blanco Roca (born 1957), Spanish Olympic sailor